Zohra Graziani-Koullou (born 7 January 1966) is a French middle-distance runner. She competed in the women's 3000 metres at the 1992 Summer Olympics.

References

1966 births
Living people
Athletes (track and field) at the 1992 Summer Olympics
French female middle-distance runners
Olympic athletes of France
Place of birth missing (living people)